Miha Gregorc (born 15 March 1979) is a Slovenian former professional tennis player.

Born in Ljubljana, Gregorc was a Petits As champion and Wimbledon junior quarter-finalist, ranking as high as 21 on the ITF Junior Circuit. In 2000 he represented Slovenia in a Davis Cup tie against Egypt and lost a dead rubber singles match to Karim Maamoun. He is the elder brother of tennis player Luka Gregorc.

ITF Futures finals

Singles: 2 (1–1)

Doubles: 4 (2–2)

References

External links
 
 
 

1979 births
Living people
Slovenian male tennis players
Sportspeople from Ljubljana